Suri (Persian: سوری ) is both a surname and a given name originated from Suri Dynasty’s ruler Sher Shah Suri and the Suri represent themselves as descendants of Muhammad Suri, one of the princes of house of the Ghorian. Notable people with the name include:

Given name
Suri Bhagavantam (1909–1989), Indian scientist

Suri Gopalakrishna (born 1943), former cricketer from India
Suri Krishnamma (born 1961), British film and television director
Suri Ratnapala, Australian academic
Suri Sehgal, American philanthropist born in India

Surname
Amir Suri, king of Ghor region, defeated by Mahmud of Ghazni
Amir Kror Suri (died 771), legendary character of the book Pata Khazana
Anoop Suri (born 1991), Indian Hotelier, writer and Motivational Teacher
Batram Suri (born 1972), Solomon Islands footballer
Himanshu Suri (born 1985), American rapper, of Das Racist
Jeremi Suri (born 1972), American historian and author.
Julian Suri (born 1991), American professional golfer
Lalit Suri (died 2006), Indian politician and owner of the LaLiT chain of hotels
Mahuy Suri, 7th Century ruler of Merv (now in Turkmenistan)
Manil Suri (born 1959), Indian-American mathematician and writer
Muhammad ibn Suri (died 1011), the king of the Ghurid dynasty from the 10th-century to 1011
Mohit Suri (born 1981), Indian film director
Natasha Suri (born 1984), former Miss World contestant from India
Nirmal Chandra Suri (born 1933), ex Air Chief Marshal of Indian Airforce
Qasim Suri (born 1969), 19th and current Deputy Speaker of the National Assembly of Pakistan 
Sanjay Suri (born 1971), Indian actor and model of Kashmiri origin
Sanjna Suri (born 1993), Malaysian model, actress and beauty pageant titleholder
Sher Shah Suri (1486–1545), medieval Pashtun emperor of India (1540–45) 
Tej Kaur Suri (1914-2007), social activist, mother of Bollywood actor Amitabh Bachchan

Fictional characters
Suri, a lemur from the 2000 Disney animated film, Dinosaur, voiced by Hayden Panettiere
Suri Polomare, from season 4 of My Little Pony: Friendship is Magic, voiced by Tabitha St. Germain

References

Persian given names
Unisex given names